The Great Profile is a 1940 American comedy film directed by Walter Lang and starring John Barrymore, Mary Beth Hughes, Gregory Ratoff and John Payne.

Synopsis
Barrymore lampoons himself. A famous actor, given to drink, nearly destroys the show, but his leading lady returns to save it. Meanwhile, a young girl tries to reform him.

Cast

John Barrymore as Evans Garrick
Mary Beth Hughes as Sylvia Manners
Gregory Ratoff as Boris Mefoosky
John Payne as Richard Lansing
Anne Baxter as Mary Maxwell
Lionel Atwill as Dr. Bruce
Edward Brophy as Sylvester
Willie Fung as Confucious
Joan Valerie as Understudy
Charles Lane as Director
Marc Lawrence as Tony
Hal K. Dawson as Ticket Seller
William Pawley as Electrician
Eddie Dunn as Furniture Man
James Flavin as Detective
Dorothy Dearing as Debutante
 John Dilson as Doctor Perkins 
 John Elliott as Pop - Stage Doorman

References

External links

1940 films
1940 comedy films
20th Century Fox films
American black-and-white films
American comedy films
Films about actors
Films directed by Walter Lang
Films produced by Darryl F. Zanuck
1940s English-language films
1940s American films